Duke with a Difference is an album by American jazz trumpeter Clark Terry featuring tracks recorded in 1957 for the Riverside label.

Reception

AllMusic awarded the album 4 stars, stating:

Track listing
All compositions by Duke Ellington except as indicated
 "C Jam Blues" (Barney Bigard, Duke Ellington) - 3:06   
 "In a Sentimental Mood" (Ellington, Irving Mills, Manny Kurtz) - 2:58   
 "Cotton Tail" - 6:56   
 "Just Squeeze Me" - 6:17   
 "Mood Indigo" (Bigard, Ellington) - 6:57   
 "Take the "A" Train" (Billy Strayhorn) - 3:31   
 "In a Mellow Tone" - 5:09   
 "Come Sunday" - 3:34
Recorded at Reeves Sound Studios in New York City on July 29 (tracks 2 & 8) and September 6 (tracks 1 & 3-7), 1957

Musicians 
Clark Terry - trumpet (all), arranger (tracks 1 & 3-7)
Quentin Jackson (tracks 2 & 8), Britt Woodman (tracks 1 & 3-7) - trombone
Johnny Hodges - alto saxophone (tracks 1, 2, 4, 5 & 8)
Paul Gonsalves - tenor saxophone (tracks 1 & 3-7)
Tyree Glenn - vibraphone, trombone (tracks 1 & 3-7)
Billy Strayhorn - piano (tracks 2 & 8)
Luther Henderson - celeste (track 2)
Jimmy Woode - bass (all)
Sam Woodyard - drums (all)
Marian Bruce - vocals (track 2)
Mercer Ellington - arranger (tracks 2 & 8)

Production personnel
Producer and liner notes - Orrin Keepnews
Engineer - Jack Higgins (tracks 2 & 8)
Engineer - Jack Matthewes (tracks 1, 3-7)
Cover photo - Paul Weller
Cover design - Paul Bacon

References 

1957 albums
Clark Terry albums
Riverside Records albums
Duke Ellington tribute albums